Philipp Stöhr (13 June 1849, Würzburg – 4 November 1911) was a German anatomist and histologist. His nephew, also named  (1891–1979), was a professor of anatomy at the University of Bonn.

He studied medicine in Würzburg, where in 1869 he became a member of the Corps Bavaria Würzburg. As a professor at the University of Würzburg, he developed a leading school of histology and embryology.

He was the author of a landmark textbook on histology and microscopic anatomy, titled Lehrbuch der Histologie und der mikroskopischen Anatomie des Menschen : mit Einschluß der mikroskopischen Technik (1887), being published over many editions. (Digital 16th edition from 1915 by the University and State Library Düsseldorf)
Stöhr's work was translated into English, and published as:
 "Text-book of histology, including the microscopical technique", (1898).
 "Stöhr's histology : arranged upon an embroyological basis", (1906).

References

External link

1849 births
1911 deaths
Physicians from Würzburg
University of Würzburg alumni
Academic staff of the University of Würzburg
German histologists
German anatomists